Leonardo Nunzella (born 4 June 1992) is an Italian footballer who plays as a defender for  club Alessandria.

Career
He made his Serie C debut for Paganese on 9 September 2012 in a game against Sorrento.

On 3 January 2019, he joined Virtus Francavilla on a free transfer.

On 17 August 2021 he signed with Fidelis Andria.

On 1 September 2022, Nunzella joined Alessandria on a one-year contract.

References

External links
 
 

1992 births
Living people
People from Brindisi
Footballers from Apulia
Italian footballers
Association football defenders
Serie B players
Serie C players
S.S.D. Città di Brindisi players
U.S. Lecce players
Paganese Calcio 1926 players
S.S. Virtus Lanciano 1924 players
Catania S.S.D. players
Parma Calcio 1913 players
Pordenone Calcio players
Virtus Francavilla Calcio players
S.S. Fidelis Andria 1928 players
U.S. Alessandria Calcio 1912 players
Sportspeople from the Province of Brindisi